The 1997 European Cup was the 18th edition of the European Cup of athletics.

The Super League Finals were held at the Olympic Stadium in Munich, Germany.

Super League

Held on 21 and 22 June in Munich, Germany.

Team standings

Results summary

Men's events

Women's events

First League
The First League was held on 7 and 8 June

Men

Group A
Held in Prague, Czech Republic

Group B
Held in Dublin, Ireland

Women

Group A
Held in Prague, Czech Republic

Group B
Held in Dublin, Ireland

Second League
The Second League was held on 28 and 29 June

Men

Group A
Held in Odense, Denmark

Group B
Held in Riga, Latvia

Women

Group A
Held in Odense, Denmark

Group B
Held in Riga, Latvia

References

Results
European Cup results (Men) from GBR Athletics
European Cup results (Women) from GBR Athletics
Results from sport-olympic.gr

1997
European Cup
European Cup
International athletics competitions hosted by Germany
Sports competitions in Munich